Voitto Valdemar Hellsten (15 February 1932 – 7 December 1998), sometimes spelled as Voitto Hellstén, was a Finnish sprinter. Hellsten competed in 100–400 m events at the 1952, 1956 and 1960 Olympics and won a bronze medal in the 400 m in 1956, shared with Ardalion Ignatyev.

Hellsten was often successful at the annual athletics meetings between Finland and Sweden.

From 1962 to 1970, Voitto Hellsten was a member of the Finnish parliament, where he represented the Social Democratic Party.

References

1932 births
1998 deaths
People from Salo, Finland
Finnish male sprinters
Athletes (track and field) at the 1952 Summer Olympics
Athletes (track and field) at the 1956 Summer Olympics
Athletes (track and field) at the 1960 Summer Olympics
Olympic athletes of Finland
Olympic bronze medalists for Finland
European Athletics Championships medalists
Medalists at the 1956 Summer Olympics
Olympic bronze medalists in athletics (track and field)
Sportspeople from Southwest Finland